The 2011 NFL season was the 92nd regular season of the National Football League (NFL) and the 46th of the Super Bowl era. It began on Thursday, September 8, 2011, with the Super Bowl XLV champion Green Bay Packers defeating the Super Bowl XLIV champion New Orleans Saints at Lambeau Field and ended with Super Bowl XLVI, the league's championship game, on February 5, 2012, at Lucas Oil Stadium in Indianapolis where the New York Giants defeated the New England Patriots.

Due to a labor dispute between league owners and players, a lockout began on March 11 and ended on July 25, lasting 130 days. Although it initially threatened to postpone or cancel the season, the only game that was canceled was the August 7 Pro Football Hall of Fame Game.

The 2011 season saw an unprecedented amount of passing offense: Three of the nine highest passing yardage totals of all time were established: No. 2 Drew Brees (5,476), No. 3 Tom Brady (5,235), and No. 9 Matthew Stafford (5,038); Eli Manning threw for 4,933 yards, which places him 14th all time. It also saw Green Bay Packers quarterback Aaron Rodgers establish the all-time single-season best quarterback rating of 122.5. Further cementing the modern NFL's reputation as a "passing league" was the fact that, for the second consecutive year, the league overall set a record for most average passing yards per team per game, with 229.7, breaking 2010's record by more than eight yards per game. (For comparison, the league-wide average rushing yards total finished the 2011 season at 57th all-time.)

A subplot of the 2011 season was determining who would have the worst record, and therefore "earn" the right to the No. 1 overall pick in the 2012 draft. Stanford senior quarterback Andrew Luck was seen as the best quarterback prospect in years. Fans of some teams that started the season with numerous losses (notably the Indianapolis Colts) were openly rooting for their teams to "Suck for Luck."

Labor dispute

 
In May 2008 the owners decided to opt out of the 1993 arrangement and play the 2010 season without an agreement in place. Some of the major points of contention included openness of owners' financial books, the rookie pay scale, a proposed 18 percent reduction in the players' share of revenues, forfeiture on bonus payments for players who fail to perform, players' health and retirement benefits, details of free agency, the cost and benefit of new stadiums, players' salaries, extending the regular season to 18 games, and the revenue-sharing structure. By March 2011, the NFLPA and the NFL had not yet come to terms on a new collective bargaining agreement, thus failing to resolve the labor dispute. Accordingly, the NFLPA informed the league and the clubs that the players had voted to have the NFLPA renounce its bargaining rights. After the renunciation of collective bargaining rights, quarterbacks Tom Brady, Peyton Manning, and Drew Brees joined seven other NFL players and filed an antitrust suit to enjoin the lockout.

Following the settlement of the Brady et al. v. NFL antitrust suit on July 25, 2011, a majority of players signed union authorization cards approving the NFL Players Association to act as their exclusive collective bargaining representative. The NFL officially recognized the NFLPA’s status as the players’ collective bargaining representative on July 30. The NFL and NFLPA proceeded to negotiate terms for a new collective bargaining agreement, and the agreement became effective after ratification by the players on August 4. The new collective bargaining agreement ran through 2021.

NFL Draft
The 2011 NFL Draft was held from April 28 to 30, 2011 at New York City's Radio City Music Hall. With the first pick, the Carolina Panthers selected quarterback Cam Newton from Auburn.

Player movement
Free agency began on July 25, 2011 following the end of the 2011 NFL lockout.

Free agency
Notable players to change teams during free agency included:

 Quarterbacks Derek Anderson (Arizona to Carolina), Bruce Gradkowski (Oakland to Cincinnati), Matt Hasselbeck (Seattle to Tennessee), Tarvaris Jackson (Minnesota to Seattle), Matt Moore (Carolina to Miami) and Vince Young (Tennessee to Philadelphia)
 Running backs Ronnie Brown (Miami to Philadelphia), Brandon Jackson (Green Bay to Cleveland), Willis McGahee (Baltimore to Denver), Darren Sproles (San Diego to New Orleans) and Ricky Williams (Miami to Baltimore)
 Fullback Vonta Leach (Houston to Baltimore)
 Wide receivers Steve Breaston (Arizona to Kansas City), Plaxico Burress (N.Y. Giants to N.Y. Jets), Braylon Edwards (N.Y. Jets to San Francisco), Sidney Rice (Minnesota to Seattle), Brad Smith (N.Y. Jets to Buffalo), Steve Smith (N.Y. Giants to Philadelphia), Roy Williams (Dallas to Chicago)
  Tight ends Kevin Boss (N.Y. Giants to Oakland), Todd Heap (Baltimore to Arizona) and Zach Miller (Oakland to Seattle)
  Offensive tackles Ryan Harris (Denver to Philadelphia) and Sean Locklear (Seattle to Washington)
  Guards David Baas (San Francisco to N.Y. Giants), Chris Chester (Baltimore to Washington) and Harvey Dahl (Atlanta to St. Louis)
  Centers Jonathan Goodwin (New Orleans to San Francisco) and Olin Kreutz (Chicago to New Orleans)
  Defensive ends Jason Babin (Tennessee to Philadelphia), Stephen Bowen (Dallas to Washington) and Ray Edwards (Minnesota to Atlanta)
  Defensive tackles Barry Cofield (N.Y. Giants to Washington), Cullen Jenkins (Green Bay to Philadelphia) and Shaun Rogers (Cleveland to New Orleans)
  Linebackers Nick Barnett (Green Bay to Buffalo), Kevin Burnett (San Diego to Miami), Thomas Howard (Oakland to Cincinnati), Manny Lawson (San Francisco to Cincinnati), Paul Posluszny (Buffalo to Jacksonville), Matt Roth (Cleveland to Jacksonville), Clint Session (Indianapolis to Jacksonville) and Stephen Tulloch (Tennessee to Detroit)
  Cornerbacks Nnamdi Asomugha (Oakland to Philadelphia), Nate Clements (San Francisco to Cincinnati), Johnathan Joseph (Cincinnati to Houston), Carlos Rogers (Washington to San Francisco) and Josh Wilson (Baltimore to Washington)
  Safeties Oshiomogho Atogwe (St. Louis to Washington), Dawan Landry (Baltimore to Jacksonville), Danieal Manning (Chicago to Houston), Quintin Mikell (Philadelphia to St. Louis), Bob Sanders (Indianapolis to San Diego) and Donte Whitner (Buffalo to San Francisco).

Trades
The following notable trades were made during the 2011 league year:

 July 28: Philadelphia traded QB Kevin Kolb to Arizona in exchange for CB Dominique Rodgers-Cromartie and Arizona's second-round selection in 2012.
 July 28: Chicago traded TE Greg Olsen to Carolina in exchange for a third-round selection in 2012.
 July 28: Washington traded DT Albert Haynesworth to New England in exchange for a fifth-round selection in 2013.
 July 29: Cincinnati traded WR Chad Ochocinco to New England in exchange for a fifth-round selection in 2012 and sixth-round selection in 2013.
 July 29: Washington traded QB Donovan McNabb to Minnesota in exchange for a sixth-round pick in 2012.
 July 29: New Orleans traded RB Reggie Bush to Miami exchange for S Jonathon Amaya and a swap of sixth-round selections in 2012.
 August 12: Buffalo traded WR Lee Evans to Baltimore in exchange for a fourth-round pick in 2012.
 August 22: San Francisco traded S Taylor Mays to Cincinnati in exchange for a seventh-round pick in 2012.
 August 29: Seattle sent CB Kelly Jennings to Cincinnati with DE Clinton McDonald going the other way.
 October 12: Seattle traded LB Aaron Curry to Oakland in exchange for a seventh-round pick in 2012 and a conditional pick in 2013.
 October 17: Denver traded WR Brandon Lloyd to St. Louis in exchange for a fifth-round pick in 2012.
 October 18: Cincinnati traded QB Carson Palmer to Oakland in exchange for a first-round pick in 2012 and a conditional second-round pick in 2013.

Rule changes
The following are rule changes that were passed at the league's annual owners meeting in March. All changes went into effect once the labor dispute was resolved.

 Changes were made regarding kickoffs to limit injuries. First, kickoffs will be moved from the 30 to the 35-yard line, repealing a 1994 rule change. In addition, players on the kickoff coverage team cannot line up more than 5 yards behind the kickoff line, minimizing running starts and thus reducing the speed of collisions.  Other changes were also proposed, but a number of players and coaches expressed concern they would actually significantly reduce, if not eliminate, the number of kickoff returns. Proposals that would have brought touchbacks out to the 25 instead of the 20, and eliminated all wedge blocks were not adopted. Despite this rule, the Bears kicked off from the 30-yard line twice in their preseason game against the Bills.
 All replay reviews of scoring plays during the entire game can now be initiated by the replay booth official. Coaches will no longer have to use one of their challenges if a scoring play occurs outside of the two-minute warning. Because the play is now "unchallengeable" by coaches, attempting to do so will result in a 15-yard unsportsmanlike conduct penalty, which several coaches were flagged for during the season.
 Nicknamed the "Boise State Rule", all playing fields must remain green, and not be in another color like the blue turf at Boise State's Bronco Stadium, unless approval is granted by the league. This was passed in response to a few sponsors who requested to change the colors in a few stadiums.

The following rule changes were adopted at the NFL Owners' Meeting on May 24, 2011:

 Hits to the head of a passer-by an opponent’s hands, arms or other parts of the body will not be fouls unless they are forcible blows, modifying the existing rule that any contact to a passer's head, regardless of the reason, is penalized as a personal foul (15 yards).
 Players will be prohibited from "launching" (leaving both feet prior to contact to spring forward and upward into an opponent or using any part of the helmet to initiate forcible contact against any part of the opponent’s body) to level a defenseless player, as well as "forcibly hitting the neck or head area with the helmet, facemask, forearm or shoulder regardless of whether the defensive player also uses his arms to tackle the defenseless player by encircling or grasping him.", and lowering the head and make forcible contact with the top/crown or forehead/"hairline" parts of the helmet against any part of the defenseless player’s body. Offenders will be penalised 15 yards for unnecessary roughness plus risking immediate disqualification if the contact is deemed flagrant.

A "defenseless player" is defined as a:
 Player in the act of or just after throwing a pass.
 Receiver attempting to catch a pass or one who has not completed a catch and hasn’t had time to protect himself or hasn’t clearly become a runner. If the receiver/runner is capable of avoiding or warding off the impending contact of an opponent, he is no longer a defenseless player.
 Runner whose forward progress has been stopped and is already in the grasp of a tackler.
 Kickoff or punt returner attempting to field a kick in the air.
 Player on the ground at the end of a play.
 Kicker/punter during the kick or return.
 Quarterback any time after a change of possession (i.e. turnover).
 Player who receives a "blindside" block when the blocker is moving toward his own end-line and approaches the opponent from behind or the side.

The league has instructed game officials to "err on the side of caution" when calling such personal foul penalties, and that they will not be downgraded if they make a mistake so that they will not hesitate on making these kinds of calls.

Game-day testing
 Game-day testing for performance-enhancing drugs. The NFL is adding game-day testing for performance-enhancing substances but not recreational drugs this season under the new collective bargaining agreement.

Schedule
The preseason schedule was released April 12, 2011. The Hall of Fame Game, had it been played, would have featured the Chicago Bears against the St. Louis Rams in only the second time since 1971 that the game would have featured two teams from the same conference. Instead, the preseason began with the San Diego Chargers hosting the Seattle Seahawks on August 11; the remainder of the preseason and all other games was played as originally scheduled (with the exception of the preseason New York Jets-New York Giants game, which was postponed two days due to Hurricane Irene).

The 2011 season began on Thursday, September 8, 2011 at Lambeau Field, with the Super Bowl XLV champion Green Bay Packers hosting the New Orleans Saints in the kickoff game; the last regular season games were held on Sunday, January 1, 2012. The playoffs started on Saturday, January 7, 2012, and ended with Super Bowl XLVI, the league's championship game, on February 5, 2012 at Lucas Oil Stadium in Indianapolis.

Under the NFL's scheduling formula, intraconference and interconference matchups were:

Intraconference
 AFC East vs. AFC West
 AFC North vs. AFC South
 NFC East vs. NFC West
 NFC North vs. NFC South

Interconference
 AFC East vs. NFC East
 AFC West vs. NFC North
 AFC North vs. NFC West
 AFC South vs. NFC South

When the league was arranging the schedule in spring 2011, it added some cushion in case the labor dispute lasted into September and the planned start of the regular season. For example, every contest in Week 3 had teams which shared the same bye week later in the season, which would have allowed these games to be made up on what were originally the teams' byes. Weeks 2 and 4 were set up so that there were neither any divisional rivalry games nor teams on bye in those weeks, and every team with a home game in Week 2 was on the road in Week 4 and vice versa.  This would have kept the season as fair as possible if those games had to be canceled.  These scheduling changes, along with eliminating the week off before the Super Bowl and moving the Super Bowl back a week, would have allowed the NFL to play a 14-game schedule beginning in mid-October while still having the Super Bowl in mid-February.

This season's International Series game featured the Chicago Bears and the Tampa Bay Buccaneers at Wembley Stadium in London on October 23, with the Buccaneers serving as the home team. The Bears won 24–18. It marked the Bears' second game played outside the United States in as many years, as they were a part of the Bills Toronto Series in 2010. The Buccaneers previously appeared in the International Series in 2009. One week later on October 30, the Buffalo Bills defeated the Washington Redskins in the Bills' annual game at Rogers Centre in Toronto by a score of 23–0. Although this was within the bounds of the 2011 CFL season, neither of the two Southern Ontario CFL teams was playing on the same day, and both played away games that weekend. The 2011–12 season also marked the 20th anniversary of the Bills and Redskins meeting in Super Bowl XXVI.

The Detroit Lions hosted their first Monday Night Football game since 2001, when they faced the Chicago Bears on Columbus Day/Canadian Thanksgiving (the Detroit-Windsor market straddles the U.S.–Canada border). The Lions defeated the Bears 24–13 for the team's fifth straight win, the most Lions wins to start a season since the team's glory years in the 1950s, continuing a streak that has been seen as a pleasant surprise for Lions fans, after over a decade of mediocrity.

The 2011 Thanksgiving Day slate featured the Super Bowl Champion Green Bay Packers winning 27–15 on the road against the Detroit Lions and the Dallas Cowboys coming back to defeat the Miami Dolphins 20–19 at home. The Thanksgiving nightcap on the NFL Network showed the Baltimore Ravens defeating the San Francisco 49ers 16–6 at home; this was the first Thanksgiving game for the 49ers since 1972, the first ever for the Ravens, and a game that put first-year 49ers head coach Jim Harbaugh against his brother, Ravens head coach John Harbaugh.

Christmas Day fell on Sunday. The TV contracts stated that the majority of afternoon games would be played on Christmas Eve (Saturday) and only one game was held over for Sunday night. The Green Bay Packers defeated the Chicago Bears, 35–21, on Christmas evening on NBC.

New Year's Day 2012 consequently also fell on a Sunday, and the NFL played its entire Week 17 schedule that day. The major college bowl games usually played on New Year's Day, as well as the NHL Winter Classic, were instead played on Monday, January 2. For the second straight year, Week 17 only featured divisional match-ups.

The New York Giants visited the Washington Redskins on September 11, 2011, the first Sunday of the regular season, to commemorate the tenth anniversary of the September 11 attacks in which Washington, D.C. and New York City were both targeted, as well as the first such anniversary since the killing of Osama bin Laden in May. Due to the proximity of Baltimore with Washington as well as the proximity of Pittsburgh with the site where United Airlines Flight 93 crashed, the Pittsburgh Steelers visited the archrival Baltimore Ravens at M&T Bank Stadium in Baltimore. It marked the first time the two teams played in a season-opening game since 2003, as their heated rivalry usually prompts their games to be scheduled later in the season. There had been some speculation that the Giants and their same-city rival, the New York Jets, could have played each other that day since the two were scheduled to play each other in 2011; the Jets were the designated home team at MetLife Stadium in the matchup which had been predetermined due to the NFL's scheduling formula. However, the Jets instead hosted the Dallas Cowboys.

Scheduling changes
The following regular-season games were moved by way of flexible scheduling, severe weather, or for other reasons:
 Week 10: The Detroit–Chicago game was moved from 1:00 pm EST to 4:15 pm EST.
 Week 11: The Tennessee–Atlanta game was moved from 1:00 pm EST to 4:15 pm EST.
 Week 13: The Indianapolis–New England game was moved from the 8:20 pm EST time slot on NBC Sunday Night Football to 1:00 pm EST on CBS. The Detroit–New Orelans game, originally scheduled at 1:00 pm EST on Fox, was flexed into the 8:20 pm slot on NBC, in place of the originally-scheduled Colts–Patriots game. The Baltimore–Cleveland game was changed from 1:00 pm EST to 4:05 pm EST. The Denver–Minnesota game was changed from 4:05 pm EST to 1:00 pm EST, and aired on Fox instead of CBS because Fox had only two games in the early time slot. This was the first time that the league moved an interconference telecast to the home team's Sunday afternoon regional broadcaster.
 Week 14: The Oakland–Green Bay game was moved from 1:00 pm EST to 4:15 pm EST.
 Week 17: By way of flexible scheduling, the following games were moved due to playoff implications during the final week of the regular season: The Dallas–New York Giants game, originally scheduled at 1:00 pm EST on Fox, was selected as the final NBC Sunday Night Football game, which decided the NFC East division champion. The Tampa Bay–Atlanta, Baltimore–Cincinnati and Pittsburgh–Cleveland games were all moved from 1:00 pm EST to 4:15 pm EST.

Regular season standings

Division

Conference

Postseason

Playoffs bracket

Records and milestones
Most points in the Kickoff Game, single team: 42, Green Bay (vs. New Orleans, September 8, 2011)
Most points in the Kickoff Game, total: 76, Green Bay (42) and New Orleans (34) – September 8, 2011
Longest kick return (tie): 108 yards, Randall Cobb (Green Bay vs. New Orleans – September 8, 2011)
Longest field goal (tie): 63 yards, Sebastian Janikowski (Oakland vs. Denver – September 12, 2011)
Most combined passing yards in a single game, broken twice:
933, Tom Brady (New England, 517) and Chad Henne (Miami, 416) – September 12, 2011
1,000, Matthew Stafford (Detroit, 520) and Matt Flynn (Green Bay, 480) – January 1, 2012
Most yards thrown by a rookie quarterback in his first game: 422, Cam Newton (Carolina vs. Arizona)
Most passing yards, rookie, season: 4,051, Cam Newton, Carolina
Most yards thrown by a quarterback, first two games of the season, broken twice:
854 yards, Cam Newton (September 18, 2011), Carolina, stands as record for a rookie
940 yards, Tom Brady (September 18, 2011), New England Patriots
Most consecutive second-half drives to end in touchdowns: 5, Buffalo (vs. Oakland, September 18, 2011)
Largest point margin prior to a successful comeback in consecutive games, modern era, broken twice:
18, Buffalo (18 vs. Oakland, 21 vs. New England)
20, Detroit (20 vs. Minnesota, 24 vs. Dallas)
Most field goals of 50 or more yards, single game (tied twice):
3, Sebastian Janikowski, Oakland (54, 55, and 50; vs. Houston, October 9, 2011)
3, Josh Scobee, Jacksonville (54, 54, and 51; vs. Baltimore, October 24, 2011)
Highest net punting average for a season: 43.99 yards, Andy Lee, San Francisco
Longest game-winning punt return touchdown in overtime: 99 yards, Patrick Peterson, Arizona (vs. St. Louis, November 6, 2011)
Most punt returns in a season for touchdown (tied): 4, Patrick Peterson, Arizona
Most punt return yards by a rookie in a season: 699, Patrick Peterson, Arizona
Most field goals in a season: 44, David Akers, San Francisco
Most points in a season without a touchdown: 166, David Akers, San Francisco
Most rushing touchdowns by a quarterback in a season: 14, Cam Newton, Carolina
Most passing yards in a season: 5,476, Drew Brees, New Orleans.
Tom Brady, New England (5,235) and Matthew Stafford, Detroit (5,038) also passed for more than 5,000 yards marking the 4th and 5th times an individual has reached that milestone in NFL history, and the first time more than one person has done it in a single season.
Fewest turnovers in a season (tied): 10, San Francisco
The 2011 Saints broke many offensive records on January 1, 2012:
Most net yardage of offense in a season: 7,474
Most net yards passing: 5,347
Most completions: 472
Highest completion percentage (team) for the season: 71.3
Fewest fumbles in a season: 6
Most first downs for the season: 416
Most passing first downs in a season: 280
Most kick-offs resulting in a touchback, season: 62
Highest third down conversion percentage: 57.9%
The 2011 Raiders also broke a few records:
Most penalties, season: 163
Most yards penalized, season: 1,358
Most all purpose yards in a season: 2,696, Darren Sproles, New Orleans
Most receiving yards by a tight end in a season, broken twice:
1310, (Jimmy Graham, New Orleans vs. Carolina)
1327, (Rob Gronkowski, New England vs. Buffalo)
Most games, 300+ yards passing, season: 13, Drew Brees, New Orleans
Most consecutive 300+ yards passing games: 7, Drew Brees, New Orleans
Punt return touchdowns, career: 12, Devin Hester, Chicago
Most consecutive games, 100+ passer rating, season: 12, Aaron Rodgers, Green Bay
Highest passer rating, season: 122.5, Aaron Rodgers, Green Bay
Most field goals of 50 or more yards, season, all teams: 90
Highest field goals of 50 or more yards percentage, season, all teams: 63.8
Highest completion percentage (individual), season: 71.2, Drew Brees, New Orleans
Longest pass completion (tied twice):
99, Tom Brady, New England (vs. Miami, September 12, 2011)
99, Eli Manning, New York Giants (vs. New York Jets, December 24, 2011)
Most consecutive games, 2+ touchdown passes (tied): 13, Aaron Rodgers, Green Bay
Most times finished in the first place: 23, New York Giants

Playoff records & milestones
Most offensive yards in a single playoff game: 627, New Orleans (vs. Detroit, Wild Card January 7, 2012)
First quarterback to reach 400+ yards in two consecutive postseason games: Drew Brees, New Orleans (First time: 2010 vs. Seattle; 2nd time: 2011 vs. Detroit – both Wild Card games)
Most first downs (tie): 34, New Orleans (vs. Detroit, Wild Card January 7, 2012)
Most receiving yards in a playoff debut: 210, Calvin Johnson, Detroit (vs. New Orleans, Wild Card January 7, 2012)
Most consecutive playoff games lost (tie): 7, Detroit Lions
Tim Tebow's game-winning pass to Demaryius Thomas for Denver (vs. Pittsburgh, Wild Card January 8, 2012) set several records:
Longest scoring play in a playoff overtime: 80 yards
Shortest time of a drive in regular and postseason overtime: 11 seconds
Quickest win in overtime: 11 seconds
Most playoff appearances: 31, New York Giants
Most completions to start a super bowl: 9, Eli Manning
Most passing yards in a single postseason: 1,219, Eli Manning
Most touchdown passes in a single playoff game (tie): 6, Tom Brady, New England
Most league championship game appearances: 19, New York Giants
Most Super Bowls Started as QB (tie): 5, Tom Brady
Record for most yards per completion (31.6) in an NFL playoff game Tim Tebow
3rd player in NFL playoff history to pass for 300 yards, and rush for 50 yards. Tim Tebow
Most Super Bowls lost (tie): 4, New England Patriots
Most playoff games won starting QB (tie): 16, Tom Brady

Regular season statistical leaders

Awards

All-Pro Team

The following players were named first team All-Pro by the Associated Press:

Players of the Week/Month
The following were named the top performers during the 2011 season:

Regular season awards

For the first time, the league held the NFL Honors, an awards show to salute the best players and plays for the season. The 1st Annual NFL Honors was held at the Murat Theatre in Indianapolis, Indiana on February 4, 2012.

Team superlatives

Offense
Most points scored: Green Bay, 560 (35.0 PPG)
Fewest points scored: St. Louis, 193 (12.1 PPG)
Most total offensive yards: New Orleans, 7,474
Fewest total offensive yards: Jacksonville, 4,149
Most total passing yards: New Orleans, 5,347
Fewest total passing yards: Jacksonville, 2,179
Most rushing yards: Denver, 2,632
Fewest rushing yards: New York Giants, 1,427

Defense
Fewest points allowed: Pittsburgh, 227 (14.2 PPG)
Most points allowed: Tampa Bay, 494 (30.9 PPG)
Fewest total yards allowed: Pittsburgh, 4,348
Most total yards allowed: Green Bay, 6,585
Fewest passing yards allowed: Pittsburgh, 2,751
Most passing yards allowed: Green Bay, 4,796
Fewest rushing yards allowed: San Francisco, 1,236
Most rushing yards allowed: Tampa Bay, 2,497

Coaching changes

Pre-season
The uncertain labor issues and the possibility of a lockout were speculated to have a minimizing effect on coaching changes prior to the 2011 season, with owners predicted to be more hesitant than usual to hire a high-price, high-profile head coach. Nevertheless, eight coaches were fired either during or immediately after the 2010 NFL season, compared to three in the year prior; only one of the new hires (John Fox) had ever been a head coach in the NFL prior to their hirings or promotions. However, Leslie Frazier, and Jason Garrett did get some experience as interim coaches during the 2010 season, with Garrett being successful in his debut season, going 5–3 in his tenure, improving the 1–7 Cowboys to a 6–10 season.

In-season
The following head coaches were replaced in-season:

Stadiums

Naming rights agreements
The following stadiums received new naming rights:

 April 27: The Oakland-Alameda County Coliseum, home of the Oakland Raiders, was renamed Overstock.com Coliseum, and later shortened to O.co Coliseum. The Raiders' home field has undergone several name changes in its history, including Network Associates Coliseum (1998–2004) and McAfee Coliseum (2004–2008).
 June 20: Qwest Field, the home of the Seattle Seahawks since , was renamed CenturyLink Field.
 August 16: INVESCO Field at Mile High, the home of the Denver Broncos, was renamed Sports Authority Field at Mile High. Sports Authority, a sporting goods retailer based in Englewood, Colorado, took over the naming rights, and agreed to pay $6 million per year for the naming rights to the Broncos' home field.
The life insurance company signed a 25-year, $17 million per year agreement with the Jets and Giants for the stadium's naming rights.
 October 4: German automaker Mercedes-Benz purchased the naming rights to the Louisiana Superdome, home of the New Orleans Saints. The Saints' home field was officially renamed the Mercedes-Benz Superdome prior to the Saints' Week 7 home game vs. the Indianapolis Colts.

In addition, the San Diego Chargers' home field, Qualcomm Stadium, was temporarily renamed "Snapdragon Stadium" for a ten-day period from December 16–25, which included the team's Week 15 home game vs. the Baltimore Ravens, as a marketing tie in for Qualcomm's Snapdragon brand.

Uniforms
The first Sunday of the season fell on the tenth anniversary of the September 11 attacks. To commemorate that event players, coaches, game officials and sideline personnel all wore a special stars and stripes ribbon bearing the dates "9/11/01" and "9/11/11" as a patch or pin. Players were also allowed to wear special red, white and blue gloves and shoes.

The Buffalo Bills introduced redesigned uniforms on June 24, 2011. Early rumors fueled by a Madden NFL 12 trailer featuring a Bills throwback uniform had indicated the team would be adopting the uniforms the team wore between 1975 and 1983; the final product indeed resembled those uniforms, with some minor adjustments. The new uniforms (which marked the first redesign since 2002) were unveiled at a fan appreciation event at Ralph Wilson Stadium. The Bills wore their white "away" uniforms in their week nine home game against the New York Jets as part of a whiteout promotion; the last time the team had worn their white uniforms at home was in 1986.

The New England Patriots' uniforms bore a patch bearing the initials "MHK" in honor of team owner Robert Kraft's wife Myra Kraft who died of cancer in July. The Patriots wore their red throwback uniforms in their week five game against the New York Jets. They wore their white jerseys at home against the Dallas Cowboys in week six, thus forcing the Cowboys to use their navy jerseys for the only time all season and the first time since 2009. As per tradition, the Cowboys wore their throwbacks on Thanksgiving Day (November 24) at home against the Miami Dolphins.

The St. Louis Rams wore their throwback uniforms in week 8 against the New Orleans Saints; the date was determined by fan voting.

The Baltimore Ravens wore their black alternative jerseys twice in 2011: with black pants against the Jets and with white pants against the 49ers.

The Tampa Bay Buccaneers wore their orange throwback uniforms during week 13 against Carolina.

The Oakland Raiders wore stickers featuring "AL" on their helmets after owner Al Davis died on October 8, 2011.

This season was the last in which the Denver Broncos wore their navy blue jerseys as their primary jersey, as the team has designated their orange jerseys—the team's alternate home jersey since —as their new primary home jersey color, beginning with the  season. The move was made due to overwhelming fan support to return to using orange as the team's primary home jersey color, which harkens back to the days of the Orange Crush Defense, as well as John Elway's return to the organization as the team's executive vice president of football operations. The team had considered making the switch for the 2011 season, but were too late to notify the NFL of the changes.

This season was the last in which the Seattle Seahawks wore their pacific blue (or "Seahawks blue") jerseys as the team's home jersey, as the team changed their home jersey color to dark navy for the 2012 season.

End of the Reebok Era
This was the last season that Reebok exclusively supplied uniforms and sideline caps along with performance and fan apparel for all 32 teams in the league, as Nike and New Era now have the 40-year rights to manufacture on-field uniforms and fan apparel, with Nike handling uniforms and performance apparel, and New Era with on-field caps.

Media
This was the sixth season under the television contracts with the league's television partners: CBS (all AFC afternoon away games), Fox (all NFC afternoon away games), NBC (17 Sunday Night Football games and the kickoff game), ESPN (17 Monday Night Football games over sixteen weeks), NFL Network (eight late-season games on Thursday night and Saturday nights), and DirecTV's NFL Sunday Ticket package. These contracts originally ran through at least 2013.

ESPN extended its contract for Monday Night Football on September 8, during the opening week of the season. This new contract, valued between $14.2 billion and $15.2 billion, extended ESPN's rights for eight seasons until 2021. It also gave them rights to expanded highlights, international and digital rights, the Pro Bowl beginning with the 2015 installment, and possibly a Wildcard playoff game. The league also signed a nine-year extension with CBS, Fox and NBC on their current contracts starting with the 2014 season through 2022.

The 2011 NFL season version of "musical chairs" brought some changes. At CBS, Dick Enberg officially retired (he broadcast San Diego Padres games for Fox Sports San Diego and its predecessor, 4SD until he retired in 2016; he died in 2017), and Marv Albert replaced him, coming over from Westwood One radio. Gus Johnson has also departed CBS and will begin calling play-by-play for Fox, mostly college games as well on FX. ESPN lost both of their sideline reporters from 2010: Michele Tafoya to NBC, where she replaced the departing Andrea Kremer, and Suzy Kolber reduced the number of games she covers to work on ESPN2's new NFL32 show, which she is hosting. ESPN, who had reduced the roles of its sideline reporters in recent years in response to NFL rule changes, used only one sideline reporter for each game of the 2011 season; among the rotating reporters include Kolber, Wendi Nix, Ed Werder, Sal Paolantonio, and Rachel Nichols. At NFL Network, Brad Nessler and Mike Mayock became its new broadcasting crew, replacing Bob Papa, Matt Millen, and Joe Theismann.

On December 22, 2010, the league announced that its national radio contract with Westwood One, which was acquired by Dial Global in the 2011 offseason, had been extended through 2014. The league also extended its contract with Sirius XM Radio through 2015. In addition to these contracts, and in a first for an NFL team, the Dallas Cowboys signed a deal to allow for nationwide broadcasts of all of its home and away games broadcast on Compass Media Networks, in addition to its existing local radio network. Compass also acquired exclusive national broadcast rights to both the International Series and Toronto Series contests.

The league did not announce plans to compensate their media partners had the season been shortened or canceled as a result of the work stoppage. NBC had ordered several low-cost reality television shows for the 2011–12 TV season in the event that Sunday Night Football could not be played, but other networks had not made public any contingency plans in the event NFL games could not be televised (in the case of CBS and Fox, the Sunday afternoon time slots could have been left unfilled and turned over to the affiliates, likely to be used for time buys by minor and extreme sports organizations, or locally programmed infomercials or movies as they are during the offseason). A work stoppage could have potentially cost these networks billions of dollars in ad revenue and other entertainment platforms that depend on the games being played. (Under the NFL's television contracts, the networks must still pay the league a rights fee regardless of whether or not the league plays any games; a March 2 ruling states that this money must be put into escrow and not be spent.) Meanwhile, the United Football League had set aside a portion of their television contract for their 2011 UFL season, as a potential package of replacement programs for the networks; while CBS and Fox briefly negotiated with the UFL regarding the package, neither network committed to carrying the games, forcing the UFL to postpone its season by a month.

References

External links
Football Outsiders: Final 2011 DVOA Ratings

 
National Football League
National Football League seasons
NFL
American football controversies